Thomas Andrew Nance (born March 19, 1991) is an American professional baseball pitcher for the Miami Marlins of Major League Baseball (MLB). He made his MLB debut in 2021 with the Chicago Cubs.

Early life and amateur career
Nance attended Woodrow Wilson High School in Long Beach, California. In high school he had a stress fracture in his lower back.

He played college baseball at Long Beach State, Cypress College, and Santa Clara. 

He underwent Tommy John surgery after his senior year of college.

Professional career

Windy City Thunderbolts
In 2015, Nance went undrafted out of Santa Clara University, and signed with the Windy City Thunderbolts of the Frontier League. In 29 games, Nance registered a 4.74 ERA and 1–1 record with 40 strikeouts in 38 innings and a 1.421 WHIP.

Chicago Cubs
On January 18, 2016, Nance had his contract purchased by the Chicago Cubs organization. He split the 2016 season between four Cubs affiliates, the Low-A Eugene Emeralds, the Single-A South Bend Cubs, the High-A Myrtle Beach Pelicans, and the Triple-A Iowa Cubs. He accumulated a 4–1 record and 2.58 ERA in 22 games between the four teams. 

He did not play in a game in 2017 due to injury, after being diagnosed with nerve injury in his shoulder. He spent the 2018 season in Double-A with the Tennessee Smokies, where he recorded a 3.48 ERA in 15 appearances. He split 2019 between Tennessee and Myrtle Beach, pitching to a 2–5 record and 4.07 ERA with 56 strikeouts in 48.2 innings of work.

Nance did not play in a game in 2020 due to the cancellation of the minor league season because of the COVID-19 pandemic. He was assigned to Triple-A Iowa to begin the 2021 season. On May 9, Nance pitched the fourth through sixth innings of a no-hitter against the Indianapolis Indians at Principal Park in Des Moines, Iowa. Preceded on the mound by Shelby Miller, he struck out five batters over three innings before being relieved by Brad Wieck and Ryan Meisinger who completed the combined no-hit game. On May 16, after recording a 1.50 ERA in 3 games with Iowa, Nance was selected to the 40-man roster and promoted to the major leagues for the first time. Nance made his MLB debut on May 17, pitching a scoreless inning of relief. In the game, he recorded his first Major League strikeout, punching out the first batter he faced, Washington Nationals infielder Josh Harrison. On June 11, Nance earned his first MLB victory against the St. Louis Cardinals. On October 2, Nance was placed on the COVID-19 injured list.

In 2021 for the Cubs the 30-year-old was 1-1 with a 7.22 ERA. In 27 games his pitched 28.2 innings, in which he gave up 23 earned runs. On March 25, 2022, Nance was designated for assignment.

Miami Marlins
On March 27, 2022, the Miami Marlins claimed Nance off waivers.

References

External links

1991 births
Living people
Baseball players from Long Beach, California
Chicago Cubs players
Miami Marlins players
Cypress Chargers baseball players
Eugene Emeralds players
Iowa Cubs players
Long Beach State Dirtbags baseball players
Major League Baseball pitchers
Myrtle Beach Pelicans players
Santa Clara Broncos baseball players
South Bend Cubs players
Tennessee Smokies players
Windy City ThunderBolts players